Schmeidler is a surname. Notable people with the surname include:

David Schmeidler (1939–2022), Israeli mathematician and economic theorist 
Rachel Schmeidler, American artist

See also
22348 Schmeidler, a main-belt asteroid
Schweidler